Dajç may refer to the following places in Albania:

 Dajç, Lezhë, a village in the municipality of Lezhë, Lezhë County
 Dajç, Shkodër, a village in the municipality of Shkodër, Shkodër County